There are in June 2022 48,564 Peruvians in Japan. The majority of them are descendants of earlier Japanese immigrants to Peru who have repatriated to Japan.

Migration history
In 1990, Japan introduced a new ethnicity-based immigration policy which aimed to encourage Japanese descendants overseas to come to Japan and fill the country's need for foreign workers. From 1992 to 1997, data from Peru's Ministry of the Interior showed Japan as the fourteenth-most popular destination for Peruvian emigrants, behind the Netherlands and ahead of Costa Rica.

Among the expatriate communities in Japan, Peruvians accounted for the smallest share of those who returned to their homelands after the global recession began in 2008. In January 2013, a number of Peruvian organizations came together to form the Asociacion de Peruanos en Japon (Association of Peruvians in Japan), dedicated to facilitating integration into Japanese society.

Media
 International Press (newspaper)
 IPC (television station)

Education
There are the following Peruvian international schools (ペルー学校) in Japan:
 Mundo de Alegría - Hamamatsu
 Colegio Hispano Americano de Gunma - Isesaki, Gunma

See also

Japan–Peru relations
Migration in Japan

Notes

References

Further reading
 
 

Japan
Immigration to Japan
Ethnic groups in Japan
Japan–Peru relations
 
South American diaspora in Japan